Maple Street Historic District is a national historic district located on "Gospel Hill" at Lewisburg, Greenbrier County, West Virginia.  The district encompasses six contributing buildings, all single family residences.  They are stylistically "worker's houses" of the type that are to be seen in many coal and timber company towns throughout West Virginia. They are one and two story frame dwellings with gable or hipped roofs, built about 1900.

It was listed on the National Register of Historic Places in 1987.

References

Houses on the National Register of Historic Places in West Virginia
Historic districts in Greenbrier County, West Virginia
Houses in Greenbrier County, West Virginia
National Register of Historic Places in Greenbrier County, West Virginia
Historic districts on the National Register of Historic Places in West Virginia